The 3rd Canadian Film Awards were presented on April 22, 1951, to honour achievements in Canadian film. The ceremony was hosted by Mary Pickford.

Winners
Film of the Year: Not awarded
Theatrical Short: Après le bagne (After Prison, What?) — National Film Board of Canada, Gil LaRoche producer, Ron Weyman director
Non-Theatrical, Open: Feelings of Depression — National Film Board of Canada, Tom Daly producer, Stanley Jackson director
Honourable Mention: The Oyster-Man — National Film Board of Canada, Michael Spencer producer, Julian Biggs and Jean Palardy directors
Amateur: Not awarded
Honourable Mention: Parking on This Side — University of Toronto Film Society, Michel Sanouillet director
Honourable mention: Frontiersman — Emmanuel J. Heuer

Special Awards:
Léo-Ernest Ouimet — "for outstanding contributions to film in Canada as a pioneer distributor, exhibitor, producer, and cameraman"
Sitzmarks the Spot, Associated Screen Studios, Bernard Norrish producer, Gordon Sparling director — "for an outstanding job in handling a comedy theme, a field in which few Canadians have excelled".
Family Tree, National Film Board of Canada, Tom Daly producer, George Dunning and Evelyn Lambart directors — "for its outstanding animation and music score".
The Fight: Science Against Cancer, National Film Board of Canada, Guy Glover producer, Morten Parker director — "for a splendid representation of a significant social problem".
Winter Angling in Comfort, Cine-Photography Branch, Province of Quebec, Maurice Montgrain producer — "for its expert handling of a 'tourist' film and excellent photography under difficult conditions".

Special Citations:
Winston Barron and Canadian Paramount News, Child Development Series, Crawley Films producer
Buffoons — Graphic Associates, Jim MacKay and George Dunning producers
Look to the Forest — National Film Board of Canada, Donald Fraser director
Trees Are a Crop — National Film Board of Canada, Evelyn Spice Cherry producer, Jack Bordelay director 
Power of Pennies — Crawley Films, F.R. Crawley producer and Quentin Brown producers, Quentin Brown director
Canadian Cameo Series — Associated Screen Studios
A Friend at the Door — National Film Board of Canada, James Beveridge and Tom Daly producers, Leslie McFarlane director
Les Anciens Canadiens (French Canada - 1534-1848) — National Film Board of Canada, Guy Glover producer, Bernard Devlin director

References

Canadian
03
1951 in Canada